The Evans House was built in 1893 by Doctor John M. Evans in Phoenix, Arizona. The -story brick residence has an unusual onion dome over the front entrance, rising from the semicircular front porch. The ground floor has seven rooms and was used as a residence, while the upper floor served as Dr. Evans' office and was reached by a separate exterior stairway.

The house was added to the National Register of Historic Places in 1976.

References

External links

 

Houses in Phoenix, Arizona
Houses completed in 1893
Houses on the National Register of Historic Places in Arizona
National Register of Historic Places in Phoenix, Arizona
Historic American Buildings Survey in Arizona
Queen Anne architecture in Arizona